is a Japanese freelance announcer, fashion model,  tarento, and actress. She is a former Fuji Television announcer from 2017 to 2022.

Biography
Akiko Kuji was born in Ōshū, Iwate. She spent 18 years in Iwate Prefecture from her birth to her high school graduation. 
She is a graduate from Mizusawa High School and Aoyama Gakuin University Department of Economics.

In 2013 she entered the entertainment industry. In March 2014, she was selected in the Asahi Kasei Group Campaign Model 2014. There was PR work from Ōshū city after this. In July, she debuted as an actress in a television drama in Kin Kyori Renai: Season Zero. In August she was selected in the Grand Prix at the 45th non-no model audition and became a magazine exclusive model from the November 2014 issue until April 2017. Until she graduated from college she belonged to Illume (Incent).

In April 2017 she joined Fuji Television as an announcer.

On 30 April 2022, she officially left Fuji Television as an announcer. On 1 May, she became an freelance announcer. She also made a comeback to entertainment industry as a fashion model, tarento, and actress. She rejoined with her agency during college era to Incent.

Personal life
Kuji is familiar with English from a young age due to the influence of her mother who was a high school teacher in English.

On 26 May 2022, Kuji announced her engagement to professional basketball player Yuta Watanabe. At the same time, they announced their marriage.

Filmography

Freelance announcer era

Current appearance programmes

Fuji TV announcer era

Television appearances

Films

Modelling era

TV programmes

Television advertisements

Advertising

TV dramas

Runways

Bibliography

Magazine serialisations

References

External links 

 
 – Ameba Blog 

Japanese female models
Japanese gravure models
21st-century Japanese actresses
Japanese announcers
Japanese cheerleaders
Aoyama Gakuin University alumni
People from Ōshū, Iwate
Models from Iwate Prefecture
1994 births
Living people